Qaleh Chanan Rural District is a rural district (dehestan) in the Central District of Karun County, Khuzestan Province, Iran. At the 2006 census, its population was 11,616, in 2,002 families.  The rural district has 10 villages. The rural district was established on 23 January 2013.

References 

Rural Districts of Khuzestan Province
Karun County
2013 establishments in Iran